Yakut or Yakutian may refer to:

 Yakuts, the Turkic peoples indigenous to the Sakha Republic
 Yakut language, a Turkic language
 Yakutian Laika, a dog breed from the Sakha Republic
 Yakutian cattle, a breed from the Sakha Republic
 Yakutian horse, a breed from the Sakha Republic
 Yakut (name)
 Central Yakutian Lowland

See also
 Yaqut (disambiguation)
 Yakutsk (disambiguation)

Language and nationality disambiguation pages